Fenimorea kathyae is a species of sea snail, a marine gastropod mollusk in the family Drilliidae.

Description
The shell grows to a length of 36 mm.

Distribution
This species occurs in the demersal zone of the Gulf of Mexico; and off Barbados and Guadeloupe at depths between 58 m and 152 m.

References

 Rosenberg, G., F. Moretzsohn, and E. F. García. 2009. Gastropoda (Mollusca) of the Gulf of Mexico, Pp. 579–699 in Felder, D.L. and D.K. Camp (eds.), Gulf of Mexico–Origins, Waters, and Biota. Biodiversity. Texas A&M Press, College Station, Texas
  Tucker, J.K. 2004 Catalog of recent and fossil turrids (Mollusca: Gastropoda). Zootaxa 682:1–1295
  Fallon P.J. (2016). Taxonomic review of tropical western Atlantic shallow water Drilliidae (Mollusca: Gastropoda: Conoidea) including descriptions of 100 new species. Zootaxa. 4090(1): 1–363

External links
 

kathyae
Gastropods described in 1995